Shallit, Shalit (šallīt "ruler"), also transliterated as Schalit or Schallit, is a Hebrew-language surname. Notable people with the surname include:
 Abraham Schalit (1898  1979), Jewish Galician-Israeli historian
 Amos de-Shalit (1926  1969), Israeli nuclear physicist
 Gene Shalit (born 1926), American film critic
 Gilad Shalit (born 1986), Israeli soldier captured by Hamas
  (18861976), Jewish Austrian-American musician and composer 
 Jean Schalit (1937-2020), French journalist
 Rabbi Joseph Shalit Riqueti (17th century), Israeli-Italian rabbi
 Jeffrey Shallit (born 1957), computer scientist, number theorist
 Joseph Shallit (19151995), an American mystery novelist and science fiction author
 Moshe Shalit (1885  1941), researcher, journalist, essayist, ethnographer, and humanist
 Paula Szalit (1886 or 1887–1920), Polish pianist
 Ruth Shalit (born 1971, Milwaukee), American journalist
 Shulamit Shalit, Israeli wiriter and essayist
 Wendy Shalit (born 1975), American author
 Willa Shalit (born 1955), Jewish American artist, activist entrepreneur, and philanthropist

See also 
 
 
 
 

Hebrew-language surnames
Jewish surnames